This article lists the confirmed squads lists for badminton's 2019 European Mixed Team Badminton Championships.

Group 1

Denmark

France

Netherlands

Spain

Group 2

England

Russia

Ireland

Germany

References 

European Mixed Team Badminton Championships